Waiwerang is a town on Adonara Island, Indonesia. It is the largest community on Adonara. In the center of Waiwerang stands an obelisk built from September 1960 to August 1961 in a square beside another square that hosts government and social events.

References

Solor Archipelago